Wanke nicht, mein Vaterland ("Do not falter, my fatherland"), also known as Schleswig-Holstein, meerumschlungen ("Schleswig-Holstein, embraced by the sea") or Schleswig-Holstein-Lied is the unofficial anthem of Schleswig-Holstein. It was written in 1844 and presented at the Schleswiger Sängerfest. The song expresses the wish for a united, independent and German Schleswig-Holstein.

History

Middle Ages 
Following the death of Adolphus VIII, childless duke of Schleswig and count of Holstein, in 1459 the nobility was keen to preserve the unity of both countries under the rule of one monarch. After the failure of the first attempts to find a successor, the Danish king Christian I came into consideration. In 1460, he was finally elected after having granted certain privileges to the nobility, amongst others the independence of Schleswig and Holstein from the Kingdom of Denmark. According to the Ripener Urkunde, no legal link existed between Schleswig, Holstein and Denkmark, save the personal union. It furthermore assured that „dat se bliven ewich tosamende ungedelt“ ("that they [Schleswig and Holstein] remain united forever").

19th century 
After the wars of liberation against Napoleonic hegemony had caused national bankruptcy for Denmark in 1813, the population of Schleswig and Holstein were taxed stronger than the Danish populace by a currency reform. Thus, the rivalry between Germans and Danes became fiercer. The southern duchies of Holstein and Saxe-Lauenburg had already been constituent states of the Holy Roman Empire before 1806 and of the German Confederation in 1815 whereas the Duchy of Schleswig was a Danish fief with the Danish king as duke and liege.

In 1840, Danish was introduced as official language in Northern Schleswig but the attempt to make Danish equal to German in the entire duchy failed due to the assembly of estates loyal to the German cause.

Schleswiger Sängerfest 
In the context of the German national movement of the 19th century, Sängerfeste (Festivals of Singers) with a political background took place throughout Germany (for example the Hambacher Fest). Following this tradition, Schleswig had its Sängerfest in 1844 where Matthäus Friedrich Chemnitz presented his song Wanke nicht, mein Vaterland, a rewritten version of a poem by Karl Friedrich Straß, in which he uttered his wish for a united, independent and German Schleswig-Holstein, which is the reason why he famously replaced the comma of Straß's version with a hyphen, thus stressing the union between both countries.<ref>Mecking, Sabine, Yvonne Wasserloos (ed.). Musik, Macht, Staat: kulturelle, soziale und politische Wandlungsprozesse in der Moderne. Göttingen: V&R unipress, 2012. Page 118.</ref>

His version of the song became immensely popular during the Sängerfest and was promoted to a sort of "battle song" for freedom and independence.

 1848–1866 

The political tensions culminated in the First Schleswig War of 1848 that ended three years later with the victory of Denmark without resolving the underlying problems. The Danish government pledged to reinstall the Danish state in its former form, thus granting every part of it the same rights.

In 1855, the Danish government designed a bilingual constitution that was rejected by the assembly of estates of Holstein and declared invalid by the Bundestag'' in Frankfurt three years later. In 1863, Denmark finally introduced a common constitution for both the Kingdom of Denmark and the Duchy of Schleswig. This violation of the agreement of 1851/1852 led to outrage in Germany.

As Denmark refused to abolish this constitution in 1864, the Second Schleswig War broke out, this time ending with German victory. Thereafter, Austria and Prussia administered the duchies of Schleswig, Holstein and Lauenburg together. After the Austro-Prussian War of 1866, Prussia annexed the duchies, forming the Province of Schleswig-Holstein.

Lyrics

Original lyrics by Karl Friedrich Straß (1844)

Explanation of the lyrics 
The "double oak" refers to a tree with two different trunks that grows separately but is nonetheless united. "Under the roof of one crown" expresses the wish to have a common government. The "threatening north" and the "mild south" allude to Denmark and Germany respectively. The "wild breakwaters" are bothersome foreign influences, and "inner tempests" apply to conflicts within Schleswig.

See also 
Badnerlied
Bayernhymne
Brandenburglied
Elsässisches Fahnenlied
Frankenlied
Hessenlied
Niedersachsenlied
Ostpreußenlied
Preußenlied
Württemberger Hymne
Zu Mantua in Banden

References

External links 
The anthem on the website of the Society for the History of Schleswig-Holstein
First stanza of the song on YouTube.

German patriotic songs
German poems